Tour de la nation (English: Tower of the Nation) in Tunis houses the Ministry of State Domains and Land Affairs. With a height of 96 meters and with 23 floors it is the second tallest skyscraper in Tunisia(the tallest being the hotel Africa with its 120 meters).

Gallery

See also 
List of tallest structures in Tunisia

References 

Skyscrapers in Tunisia
1990 establishments in Tunisia
Buildings and structures completed in 1990
Buildings and structures in Tunis